CPL Resources PLC is a human resources company based in Dublin that operates in Ireland and Europe. It was founded in 1992. CPL was founded by current CEO Anne Heraty and Keith O'Malley as Computer Placement Ltd in 1989. Currently, the group has 12 companies spread over 21 offices: 12 in the Republic of Ireland, two in Northern Ireland, and seven in the rest of Europe.

Description 
As of 2010, CPL consisted of 12 companies with 21 offices (excluding the place of work at the premises of CPL's customers):
 CPL: IT, construction, sales/marketing, call-centers  (using companies and/or trade-names as: CPL Resourcing, CPL Solutions, CPL Engineering etc.)
 Careers Register - Finance, accounting, banking and insurance
 Tech Skills - Engineering and construction
 ThornShaw - Pharmaceutical & Medical Devices
 Flexsource - Industrial, Manufacturing, Hotel & Catering, Retail, Logistics, Construction and Warehousing
 Ardlinn - Executive Search consultancy specializing in senior appointments (€100,000+) 
 Clinical Professionals Group - Europe's leading life science recruiter
Covalen - Managed Services, Outsourcing, Consulting & Advisory Services.

History 
In 1989, Anne Heraty and Keith O'Malley founded Computer Placement Ltd. providing staff for the IT industry. In 1992, Heraty bought out the other shareholders, including O'Malley and became the 100% owner of CPL. In 1996, Heraty's husband Paul Carrol joined the company. Currently, he is the director of Business Development. In 1994, a restructuring of Computer Placement Ltd. started and from then on they used CPL mainly as a trade-name. The restructuring continued over the next few years and in 1996 the companies' CPL Engineering (construction) and CPL Solutions (IT/call centres) were founded. In 1997 the first new office opened in Limerick. In 1998, some new divisions were set up within Computer Placement Ltd: CPL Telecoms, CPL Sales and CPL Financial.

In 1999, the PLC, CPL Resource PLC was founded and the shares were floated on the DCM marker of the Irish Stock Exchange and the Alternative Investment Market (AIM) market at the London Stock Exchange. In the same year, the company opened an office in Northern-Ireland.

In the 2000s, CPL acquired a number of companies including Careers Register, Tech Skills and Multiflex.

In July 2018, a Channel 4 investigation on Dispatches titled Inside Facebook: Secrets of a Social Network described CPL's role in providing content moderation services to Facebook through a team of employees who were instructed to allow certain types of graphic violence and hate speech to remain on Facebook. In March 2019, a former worker at CPL's Dublin location reported a high-pressure environment where moderators were required to evaluate videos containing graphic violence, child pornography, animal abuse, and other disturbing content with the expectation of meeting a 98% "quality rating".

Mergers and acquisitions  
CPL has acquired over a dozen companies during its existence. These were all acquired after its listing as a public company.

Financials 
CPL's financial year runs from 1 July to 30 June of the next year. In the table below (and other text) the years mentioned are fiscal years. For example, 2010 means the fiscal year from July 1, 2009, up to and including June 30, 2010.

In the table below figures are published over the period FY 2006 - FY 2009 and also the figures over the first year that CPL was trading on the LSE and ISE (2000). Each figure is followed by its delta comparing it to the previous year with these exceptions:
the delta between 2000 and 2006 is the average growth per year
the delta over 2000 is a relative growth in %.

Board of directors
The board of CPL Resources PLC. is per 30-06-2009 as follows:

The percentages given in the last column of the table above are based on the number of issued shares as of June 2010. The number of issued shares is 37,199,825.

Heraty and her husband Carrol own over 40% of all issued shares in CPL Resources PLC. This stake in the company represents a value of €36 million based on the average price in May 2010 of €2.40. Using the year-low prices of approximately €1.45, as it was in June/July 2009, this represents a value of some €22 million.

References

External links
 

Companies listed on Euronext Dublin
Companies listed on the London Stock Exchange
Business services companies established in 1992
Irish companies established in 1992